Nunzia Catalfo (born 29 July 1967) is an Italian politician, member of the Five Star Movement. She served as Minister of Labour and Social Policies in the Conte II Cabinet.

Early life and education
Catalfo was born in Catania on 29 July 1967. She has a high school degree in science.

Career
In 2013 she became a senator for the Five Star Movement. She was re-elected to the Senate in 2018. On 5 September 2019 she was appointed the Minister of Labour and Social Policies in the second Conte cabinet.

Personal life
Catalfo is married and has two children.

References

21st-century Italian women politicians
1967 births
Conte II Cabinet
Five Star Movement politicians
Italian Ministers of Labour
Living people
Politicians from Catania
Senators of Legislature XVII of Italy
Senators of Legislature XVIII of Italy
Women government ministers of Italy
20th-century Italian women
Women members of the Senate of the Republic (Italy)